Metal Seinen is a start-up based in Karachi, Pakistan created by Zeeshan Shah in May 2006. The firm provides a social network for people who share an interest in learning about and experiencing the international culture. It provides free and premium plans for artistic collaboration which may lead to opportunities for its members to engage deeply in culture. These ventures currently include digital art, literature, and music. It organizes events and activities for its members, including participation in larger cultural events. The social network is maintained through its online presence and its offline events.

"Metal" is the English word for a strong material and "Seinen" comes from the Japanese word that translates to "youth". The name originally reflected the desire of the founders to differentiate them from the existing diaspora.

History 
The members mostly came together by means of nontraditional interests such as anime, gaming, digital art, music and even performance racing.  The group was brought together by Zeeshan Shah who is a graduate from Northwestern University. 

In May 2006, Zeeshan Shah organized an "anime convention" at the SZABIST Karachi Campus. This convention was the first of its kind in Pakistan. At this time, anime fans generally considered themselves to be quite low in number. This free-for-entry event was the first indication that there were many more anime-fans then anyone expected. It was through the social media network of orkut that many outsiders were able to find about the event.

The event had an audience of 200 to 250 people. The event brought together people of different interests. Since the event was designed to be a workshop with presentations on the anime industry, artists and hobbyists, it gave people the confidence to speak about their own projects. There were mentions of artworks, literary works and other ventures.
After the event, an artist, a musician and a software engineer who shared common interests discussed over tea the feedback of the event. There had been individuals, artists by profession, who had been inspired by the event and wanted to discuss ideas and collaboration for their own ‘manga’.  This quest for collaboration displayed a need in the market and thus led to an epiphany for Zeeshan. ‘Metal Seinen’ was born.

Pivot

The original mission of the group was to be a 'platform for creativity'. A group which propagates creative and professional progression though mutual efforts of its members. It attempted to establish a model of mutual collaboration among hobbyists. Any activity was welcome as long as it was considered to be creative by the members. The group garnered support from hobbyists active in the community. The model which was first tried can be explained through the following examples:

One might ask what the mutual benefit in all this is. The answer is; the individual who came up with the song had the opportunity to create it and can now use it for the geo competition, the individual can also add it into his/her portfolio and even move onto managing or advising such projects. The musician has a similar benefit, adding it to his portfolio, giving out a sample CD and moving onto further projects.

Another example which came forward was:

An artist had an idea for the story of a manga (comic). The artist wanted fellow artists, scriptwriters; basically, a support team with which he could properly create a manga (comic) even if it were only on the web. The artist met up with a musician who did his OST for promotion purposes, while in return the artist received album art, band logo art. Similarly, he met with a web developer who was working on the open source CMS- Joomla- they mutually agreed to helping each other out, creating a site for the manga, while having the experience of creating such a website for CV/portfolio purposes.

Due to a mix of success and failures, the group decided to pivot from the original idea to being a membership model garnered towards aspects of cultural exposure focusing on Japan initially. This was to be achieved through networking and active projects of a cultural aspect.

Mission and Values

Mission

“To be a platform for art ventures and international culture elements”.

Values

Our values serve as a compass for our actions and describe how we behave in the world. At Metal Seinen, the values we believe for all our collaboration and activities are 
 People: Be a great place to collaborate where people are inspired
 Proactive
 Passion: Committed in heart and mind
 Integrity: Be real 
 Simplicity: Never Give Up but be reasonable 
 Collaboration: Leverage collective genius

Projects 

There are numerous projects that have been completed and some still ongoing at the hands of Metal Seinen.

Awards 
 Co-host of Japan Fest 2012 to celebrate 60th anniversary of Pak-Japan relations 
 Letter of Appreciation from Japanese Consul 2008. 
 Featured on Dawn Images 2006 
 Featured in Daily times 2008

Events

Cultural Events

Anime & Manga
To-date, Metal Seinen has been the only organizer of events and activities related to manga and anime in Pakistan. It has been responsible from two anime conventions, both held in Karachi, Pakistan in the auditorium of SZABIST. The first anime convention was held on May 20, 2006. The second anime convention, which was held on January 13, 2007, was more distinguished as its details were also published on an international standard newspaper as well as being covered by WCCFTECH. This convention had an event plan, original works and various other activities. Before this convention, the idea of mutual collaboration was already underway. It was also the first display of ReckoningStorm and Eidolon. The first trailer for the comic project of Eidolon was also shown here. The event had anime discussions, presentations, trailers and anime posters. It also featured J-Movies such as Casshern. It was attended by the SZABIST President at the time, Javaid Laghari who complimented the team on the effort. 

With Metal Seinen's increasing popularity however, their plans for the next convention changed drastically. Rather than having a simple anime orientated convention, the "Convention of the creatives" was a convention of a much broader spectrum as it not only dealt with current anime affairs but also concerned local music, gaming and avid artists.

JapanFest & Consulate Activities

A two-day Japanese festival was held on March 10 and 11 to mark the 60th anniversary of the diplomatic relations between Pakistan and Japan in Karachi, Pakistan. Metal Seinen held drawing sessions led by Lucid Productions, video gaming and anime activities.

Metal Seinen has also arranged presentations at the Japanese Consulate in Karachi, Pakistan. More details can be found at the Facebook fan page. Members from Metal Seinen were also involved in the Jenesys program in 2013. The JENESYS Programme (Japan-East Asia Network of Exchange for Students and Youths) is a project advanced by the Japanese government from the standpoint of providing a sound foundation for strong solidarity within Asia through large-scale youth exchange.  In 2014, members of Metal Seinen experienced foreign culture through the program and came back with great personal stories.

Workshops & Meetups

Metal Seinen has held workshops geared more towards the different aspects of foreign culture. A seminar was held on November 7, 2008 at SZABIST, where the aspects of their organization was put forward to the attendees, after which they had a gaming session which included next-generation gaming consoles. Other events have been held at The Second Floor and Cafe Gloria Jean's in Karachi, Pakistan.

References 

Cultural organisations based in Pakistan